Cytherideidae is a family of ostracods belonging to the order Podocopida.

Genera

Genera:
 Amazonacytheridea Purper, 1979
 Anomocythere Sohn, 1951
 Archeocyprideis Ducasse & Carbonel, 1994

References

Ostracods